Rarhi may refer to:
 A person from the Rarh region.
 Rarhi dialect, a dialect of the Bengali language spoken in the Rarh region.